In My Tribe is an album by the American alternative rock band 10,000 Maniacs. Released on July 27, 1987 by Elektra Records, it was their second major-label album and their first to achieve large-scale success. John Lombardo, Natalie Merchant's songwriting partner on previous albums, had left the band in 1986, and In My Tribe saw Merchant begin to collaborate with the other members of the band, most notably with Rob Buck.

Controversy
In 1989, the band's recording of Cat Stevens' "Peace Train" was removed from the U.S. CD and cassette versions of the album, after comments made by Stevens (by then a Muslim convert, known as Yusuf Islam) that were perceived to be supportive of the fatwa on Salman Rushdie. The song remained on copies released outside the United States. It was later included on the band's 2-CD compilation Campfire Songs: The Popular, Obscure and Unknown Recordings, released on January 24, 2004 by Elektra/Asylum/Rhino Records.

Artwork
The front cover of the CD edition is a black-and-white photograph of children with bows and arrows in an archery class, a theme used by record and cassette editions with different covers.

Reception

In a contemporary review, Rolling Stones J. D. Considine wrote that "with In My Tribe, the group has finally come into maturity. It isn't simply that the songs are richer and more resonant this time around; the band itself seems to have grown." In 1989, Rolling Stone ranked the album number sixty-five on their list of the 100 greatest albums of the 1980s, summing it up as "a poetic, heartfelt message about social concerns such as alcoholism, child abuse and illiteracy." Robert Hilburn of the Los Angeles Times largely praised the album, in particular Peter Asher's production, which he felt made the band "more forceful and accessible" and brought Merchant's vocals to the foreground. While he also felt the band were recycling musical ideas from departed guitarist John Lombardo, he stated that "the advances in Merchant's singing and lyrics—both are more intimate and assured—help offset the problems of over-familiarity." Robert Christgau of The Village Voice was critical of Merchant's "nasal art-folk drawl", but added that "by deprivatizing her metaphors, she actually says something about illiteracy, today's army, and cruelty to children."

In a retrospective review, AllMusic reviewer Chris Woodstra wrote that "the album proves powerful not for the ideas [...] but rather for the graceful execution and pure listenability."

Track listing
All songs written by Natalie Merchant, except where noted. 

Side one
 "What's the Matter Here?" (Robert Buck, Merchant) – 4:51
 "Hey Jack Kerouac" (Buck, Merchant) – 3:26
 "Like the Weather" – 3:56
 "Cherry Tree" (Buck, Merchant) – 3:13
 "The Painted Desert" (Jerome Augustyniak, Merchant) – 3:39
 "Don't Talk" (Dennis Drew, Merchant) – 5:04

Side two
 "Peace Train" (Cat Stevens) – 3:26
 Omitted from later U.S. CD releases
 "Gun Shy" – 4:11
 "My Sister Rose" (Augustyniak, Merchant) – 3:12
 "A Campfire Song" – 3:15
 "City of Angels" (Buck, Merchant) – 4:17
 "Verdi Cries" – 4:27

Personnel

10,000 Maniacs
Natalie Merchant – voice
Robert Buck – guitars, mandolin, pedal steel guitar
Dennis Drew – keyboards
Steve Gustafson – bass guitar
Jerome Augustyniak – drums, percussion

Additional musicians
Michael Stipe – other voice on "A Campfire Song"
Don Grolnick – piano on "Verdi Cries"
Dennis Karmazyn – cello on "Verdi Cries"
Novi Novog – viola on "Verdi Cries"
Bob Magnusson – double bass on "Verdi Cries"

Technical
Peter Asher – producer
David Campbell – string arrangement on "Verdi Cries"
George Massenburg – engineer, mixing
Frank Wolf – mixing
Sharon Rice – additional engineering
Shep Lonsdale – assistant engineer
Duane Seykora – assistant engineer
Mike Reese – mastering
Doug Sax – mastering
Edd Kolakowski – production assistant
Kosh – design, art direction
Todd Eberle – portraits of menfolk
Kris Nielson – portrait of Natalie

Charts

Weekly charts

Year-end charts

Singles

Certifications

References

10,000 Maniacs albums
1987 albums
Elektra Records albums
Albums produced by Peter Asher
Albums arranged by David Campbell (composer)